Frank Edward Luce (December 6, 1896 – February 3, 1942) was an outfielder in Major League Baseball. He played for the Pittsburgh Pirates in 1923.

References

External links

1896 births
1942 deaths
Major League Baseball outfielders
Pittsburgh Pirates players
Baseball players from Ohio
People from Medina County, Ohio
Nashville Vols players